Eastern Ontario (census population 1,763,186 in 2016) is a secondary region of Southern Ontario in the Canadian province of Ontario which lies in a wedge-shaped area between the Ottawa River and St. Lawrence River. It shares water boundaries with Quebec to the north and New York State to the east and south, as well as a small land boundary with the Vaudreuil-Soulanges region of Quebec to the east.

It includes the cities of Ottawa, Brockville, Cornwall, Kingston and Pembroke, the towns of Gananoque, Prescott and Smiths Falls, and the counties of Prescott and Russell, Stormont, Dundas and Glengarry, Lanark, Renfrew, Leeds and Grenville, Frontenac and Lennox and Addington.

Some sources may also include Hastings, Prince Edward, and occasionally Northumberland in the definition of Eastern Ontario, but others classify them as Central Ontario.

The region may also be referred to as Southeastern Ontario to differentiate it from the Northern Ontario secondary region of Northeastern Ontario.

History

French explorers and fur traders were the first recorded Europeans to pass through this region. Samuel de Champlain, explorer, traversed the Ottawa River in 1615 on his way westward to the Great Lakes. The largest city in the region is the city of Ottawa, capital of Canada, which accounts for roughly 60% of Eastern Ontario's population. Kingston, itself once capital of the Province of Canada, is another city in the region outside of the National Capital Region.

Much of the remainder of the region relies on agriculture and tourism. Heavier reliance on recreation and tourism exists in the more rugged Renfrew county in the northwest of Eastern Ontario.

Of all Ontario's regions, parts of Eastern Ontario are the most heavily influenced by the United Empire Loyalists, American settlers who moved to Upper Canada out of loyalty to the British Crown during and after the American Revolutionary War. The Loyalist influence has a presence in the counties of Lennox and Addington, Leeds and Grenville, Frontenac, Lanark, Hastings, and Prince Edward.

In Ottawa, Prescott and Russell, Stormont, Dundas and Glengarry, and Renfrew, Eastern Ontario is home to the largest Franco-Ontarian community within Ontario.

Extensive immigration by Scottish Highlanders from the Highland land clearances also took place around the time of the United Empire Loyalist migration. After the Loyalist period, more waves of Highland emigration came primarily from Inverness-shire, Scotland to seek a better quality of life. The majority of these Scottish immigrants settled in the specific Highland community Glengarry County. Large numbers of Irish Catholics, mainly from Cork and surrounding counties also settled in the area in the decades following the War of 1812, the majority of them in or near present-day Ottawa. Many arrived through government backed immigration schemes to settle unoccupied lands and fill labour shortages. Along with the Franco-Ontarians in particular, they made up the majority of canal builders on the large Rideau Canal project and were heavily employed in the area's extensive lumber industry.

Through the last century, newer immigrant groups, both Francophone and non-Francophone, have added to the cultural diversity, mostly in Ottawa. There are a large number of Francophones in Eastern Ontario, especially in Prescott and Russell United Counties.

Climate
The climate of Eastern Ontario is humid continental with large seasonal variation. Snow and ice are dominant during the winter season. Ottawa receives close to 250 cm (100 in) of snowfall over an average winter.

Winters are long and celebrated in Eastern Ontario. The average temperature in January is 21 °F (-6 °C).
In recent years, there has been winters with snow free periods lasting into early January. However, in the winter months of 2008 and 2019, there were records levels of snow fall.

Ice storms are also relatively common, especially on lower terrain if compared with other parts of the country. One such large storm caused vast power outages and affected the local economy, known as the 1998 Ice Storm. Winters are more severe and longer along the Ottawa River, particularly in higher terrain of Renfrew County than further south along the Upper St. Lawrence River shoreline.

Summers are fairly hot and humid in the Ottawa and St. Lawrence valleys. The average July maximum temperature is 80 °F (27 °C). Temperatures occasionally exceed 35 °C (95 °F), and during periods of hot weather, high humidity is often an aggravating factor, pushing the temperature into the 100 °F (40 °C) with the humidex. Thunderstorms are on occasion severe, causing tree and property damage.

Spring and fall (especially spring) are changeable seasons, prone to extremes in temperature and unpredictable swings in conditions. Average annual precipitation is around 950 mm (37 in.).

Geography

The eastern section of Eastern Ontario, that is east and southeast of Ottawa, including the towns of Cornwall, Embrun and Hawkesbury is generally a flat plain, dotted with some extensive woodlots and boggy marshes, but is primarily farmland. Certain sections here are prone to low-lying flooding and spring ice jams, particularly on the banks of the South Nation River.

The Laurentian Highlands, which form a small section of the extensive Canadian Shield, cuts through the western section from the Upper Ottawa River valley southeast toward to the St. Lawrence River around Gananoque. Here sedimentary rock can be found folding over the Shield. This is also the portion where the greatest concentration of inland lakes are found. In Renfrew County, this higher terrain is called the 'Madawaska Highlands' after a major river that bisects these hills. Some highland peaks are over 400 m higher than the Ottawa River. The picturesque area of the St. Lawrence River bordering New York State is known as the Thousand Islands region reflected by its numerous small islands. The bulk of the Laurentian Upland is located just to the north of the Ottawa River in adjacent Quebec and covers a vastly larger area within that province.

Along the extreme western edge of Eastern Ontario is a continuation of the Laurentian Highlands, known as the Opeongo Hills, and they contain some of the highest elevations in Southern Ontario. They stretch into the northern portions of Central Ontario, near Algonquin Provincial Park.

Ottawa is at the confluence of the Rideau River and Ottawa River. A series of rugged rapids and waterfalls are found along these rivers in Ottawa. Most of the underlying rock in and around the city of Ottawa is limestone bedrock, also found in abundance farther south around Kingston. Limestone was used during the construction of the Rideau Canal, which connects Kingston and Ottawa by water and was also heavily used as the building blocks for many governmental and other buildings in both cities.

The Ottawa and St. Lawrence Rivers do not actually converge in Ontario. A small portion of Quebec, Vaudreuil-Soulanges, lies between the Ontario-Quebec border and the river junction. The region has a land border with Ontario, but it is necessary to cross water to reach any other part of Quebec.

Geology
The Eastern Ontario region has a history of earthquakes. Several faults run through the region, and the area is near both the Western Quebec Seismic Zone and the Saint Lawrence rift system. Minor earthquakes occur in the region regularly, most of them too weak to be felt by people. More severe earthquakes, around 5–6 on the Richter magnitude scale, occur every sixty years, on average. The most recent of the earthquakes occurred in 2010. This earthquake, known as the 2010 Central Canada earthquake although it caused some power outages and minor damage to older buildings, did not cause significant damage because buildings in the area are required to be earthquake resistant by government regulations. The earthquake caused significant panic amongst the population, though: office buildings were evacuated in Ottawa, transit routes shut down, and in the minutes after the quake, cell phone service was down, as it was overloaded with calls made by panicked people attempting to talk to friends and relatives. Although the reaction was ridiculed by many, if buildings in the area were not designed to be earthquake-resistant, it would have caused significant damage. A similar earthquake in 1944 caused significant damage to buildings in Cornwall, as it was before earthquake-resistant architecture became common.

Education

The region is home to several universities and colleges, including Carleton University, Queen's University, Royal Military College of Canada, the University of Ottawa, Saint Paul University, Algonquin College, La Cité collégiale, and St. Lawrence College.

Algonquin College has campuses in Ottawa, Perth, Pembroke, Hawkesbury, and Renfrew, while St. Lawrence College has campuses in Kingston, Cornwall, and Brockville.

Major urban areas in Eastern Ontario

References

External links